
Gmina Krzyżanów is a rural gmina (administrative district) in Kutno County, Łódź Voivodeship, in central Poland.

Villages
Gmina Krzyżanów contains the villages and settlements of Brony, Goliszew, Julianów, Kaszewy Dworne, Kaszewy Kościelne, Kaszewy Tarnowskie, Kaszewy-Kolonia, Kaszewy-Spójnia, Konary, Krzyżanów, Krzyżanówek, Ktery A, Ktery B, Ktery SK, Kuchary, Łęki Górne, Łęki Kościelne, Łęki Kościelne SK, Malewo, Marcinów, Micin, Mieczysławów, Młogoszyn, Pawłowice, Psurze, Różanowice, Rustów, Rybie, Siemienice, Siemieniczki, Sokół, Stefanów, Świniary, Uroczysko Leśne, Wały A, Wały B, Wierzyki, Władysławów, Wojciechowice Duże, Wojciechowice Małe, Wyręby Siemienickie, Żakowice, Zawady, Zieleniew and Złotniki.

Neighbouring gminas
Gmina Krzyżanów is bordered by the gminas of Bedlno, Góra Świętej Małgorzaty, Kutno, Oporów, Piątek and Witonia.

References
Polish official population figures 2006

Krzyzanow
Kutno County